Vela Nigrin (born Augusta Nigrin) was a Slovenian stage actress who performed in Belgrade in the latter part of the 19th century. She was sometimes known as Vela Nigrinova.

Life and work

Nigrin's father, August was a railway official whose daughters Marija, Gizela, Matilda, and Augusta were all actresses or singers. Nigrin first appeared on the stage of the Slovenian Dramatic Society on 19 April 1876 as "Lady Clarens" in the play "Lowood Orphan". Davorin Jenko the director of the Serbian Theater in 1882 contracted her for the National Theater in Belgrade. She soon became one of the first artists of this theater and opportunities for the most demanding roles opened up for her.

During her stage career she performed extensively in Prague, Sofia, and Zagreb; she also occasionally visited Ljubljana, where she was met with mixed reviews.

Legacy
The Serbian government issued a commemorative stamp in her honor and also there is a street in Belgrade that was named after her.

References 

1862 births
1908 deaths
People from Ljubljana
Slovenian stage actresses
19th-century actresses